A People's Republic of China Permit for Proceeding to Hong Kong and Macao, or One-way Permit, is a document issued by the People's Republic of China allowing residents of mainland China to leave the mainland permanently to settle in Hong Kong or Macau.

The scheme was introduced in 1980. The travel restriction was needed to prevent large volumes of people coming to Hong Kong or Macau and preventing illegal immigration.

Citizen rights 
When settling to Hong Kong or Macau, the household registration in the mainland is relinquished, however, a person need to reside in the SAR for 7 years for the permanent resident status, which grants citizen rights. Therefore, before the person can acquire permanent resident status, he/she is effectively a second-class citizen in the SAR, without citizen rights (e.g. getting a passport) in both mainland China or the SAR.

Selected statistics on One-way Permit Holders (OWPHs) 

As of the end of 2016, approximately 950,000 mainland migrants came from the program, representing about 12.8% of Hong Kong's total population.

Controversy 
Although the permit is specifically for the purpose of family reunion, not for general immigration, the scheme is controversial. Hong Kong currently has a quota of 150 people per day and the waiting time for spouses is currently 4 years.  Journalist Ching Cheong alleges that the scheme, whose beneficiaries are at the sole discretion of the PRC government and outside of the vetting procedures of the Hong Kong Immigration Department, is an infiltration mechanism by spies and friends of the regime into Hong Kong; those that are not filled by spies become a graft mechanism for officials. Martin Lee said that the policy is part of the CPC's strategy of long-run "Tibetisation" of Hong Kong, aimed at marginalising Hong Kong people and their core values over time.

See also 

 Exit-Entry Permit for Travelling to and from Hong Kong and Macau: The permit issued to Mainland Chinese residents visiting Hong Kong and Macau temporary.
Home Return Permit
Taiwan Compatriot Entry Permit

References 

Human rights in China
Immigration to Hong Kong
Hong Kong travel documents